Wang Tong (born 2 August 1997) is a Chinese footballer currently playing as a midfielder for Shenzhen.

Club career
Wang Tong would play for the Shenzhen youth team and was promoted to the senior team in the 2018 China League One campaign where he made his debut and scored his first goal in a Chinese FA Cup game on 10 April 2018 against Suzhou Dongwu F.C. in a 2-1 defeat. He go on to be part of the squad would gain promotion to the top tier at the end of the league campaign.

Career statistics

 
Notes

References

External links

1997 births
Living people
Chinese footballers
Association football midfielders
China League One players
Chinese Super League players
Shenzhen F.C. players